The Alzheimer's disease biomarkers are neurochemical indicators used to assess the risk or presence of the disease. The biomarkers can be used to diagnose Alzheimer's disease (AD) in a very early stage, but they also provide objective and reliable measures of disease progress. It is imperative to diagnose AD disease as soon as possible, because neuropathologic changes of AD precede the symptoms by years. It is well known that amyloid beta (Aβ) is a good indicator of AD disease, which has facilitated doctors to accurately pre-diagnose cases of AD. When Aβ peptide is released by proteolytic cleavage of amyloid-beta precursor protein, some Aβ peptides that are solubilized are detected in CSF and blood plasma which makes AB peptides a promising candidate for biological markers. It has been shown that the amyloid beta biomarker shows 80% or above sensitivity and specificity, in distinguishing AD from dementia. It is believed that amyloid beta as a biomarker will provide a future for diagnosis of AD and eventually treatment of AD.

Amyloid beta
Amyloid beta (Aβ) is composed of a family of peptides produced by proteolytic cleavage of the type I transmembrane spanning glycoprotein amyloid-beta precursor protein (APP). Amyloid plaque Aβ protein species ends in residue 40 or 42, but it is suspected that Aβ42 form is crucial in the pathogenesis of AD. Although Aβ42 makes up less than 10% of total Aβ, it aggregates at much faster rates than Aβ40. Aβ42 is the initial and major component of amyloid plaque deposits. While the most prevalent hypothesis for mechanisms of Aβ-mediated neurotoxicity is structural damage to the synapse, various mechanisms such as oxidative stress, altered calcium homeostasis, induction of apoptosis, structural damage, chronic inflammation and neuronal formation of amyloid has been proposed. Observation of AB42/AB40 ratio has been a promising biomarker for AD. However, as AB42 fails to be a reliable biomarker in plasma, attention was drawn for alternative biomarkers.

Current biomarkers

BACE1

Various enzymatic digestion including beta secretase (β secretase), and gamma-secretase (γ-secretase) will cleave amyloid-beta precursor protein (APP) into various types of amyloid beta (Aβ) protein. Most β-secretase activity originates from an integral membrane aspartyle protease encoded by the β-site APP-cleaving enzyme 1 gene (BACE1). Dr. Zetterberg and his team used a sensitive and specific BACE1 assay to assess CSF BACE1 activity in AD. It was found that those with AD showed increased BACE1 expression and enzymatic activity. It was concluded that elevated BACE 1 activity may contribute to the amyloidgenic process in Alzheimer's disease. CSF BACE1 activity could be a potential candidate biomarker to monitor amyloidogenic APP metabolism in the CNS.

Soluble Aβ precursor protein (sAPP)

APP is an integral membrane protein whose proteolysis generates beta amyloid ranging from 39- to 42- amino acid peptide. Although the biological function of APP are not known, it has been hypothesized that APP may play a role during neuroregeneration, and regulation of neural activity, connectivity, plasticity, and memory. Recent research has shown that large soluble APP (sAPP) that are present in CSF may serve as a novel potential biomarker of Alzheimer's disease. In an article published in Nature, a group led by Lewczuk performed a test to observe the performance of a soluble form of APP α and β. A significant increase in sAPP α and sAPP β was found in people with AD as compared to normal subjects. However, the CSF level of α-sAPP and β-sAPP was found to be contradictory. Although many researchers have found that the CSF level of α sAPP increases in some people with AD, some report that there is no significant change, while Lannfelt argues that there is a slight decrease. Therefore, more studies using experimental models are needed in order to confirm the validity of sAPP as a biological marker for AD.

Autoantibodies

Researchers at Indiana University found that titres of anti-beta-amyloid antibodies in cerebral spinal fluid was lower in AD patients compared to healthy patients.

Novel approach 
Recent studies primarily focus on use of an autoantibody, not only for biological markers but for future treatment. However, there are various arguments whether an autoantibody method provides a reliable biomarker. A number of reports show that patients with AD have lower levels of serum anti-AB antibodies than healthy individuals, and others have argued that the level of anti-AB antibody may be higher in AD. In order to avoid provide solution for discrepancy in the existing data, Dr. Gustaw came up with novel method of dissociation sample.

Theory 
In biological fluids, antibodies and antigens are in a state of dynamic equilibrium between bound and unbound forms that is concentration-dependent. As antigen masks the antibody, it obstructs accurate measurement of antibody-antigen detection. Dr. Gustow discovered a novel way to enhance antibody-antigen detection. Using a dissociation buffer (1.5% bovine serum albumin (BSA) and 0.2M glycine HCl pH2/5), he dissociated antigen-antibody complexes. In dissociated samples, unbound antigen-antibody complexes reveal increased disease state compared to non-diseased state.

Method 
 Prepare dissociation buffer: 1.4% bovine serum albumin + 0.2M glycine-HCL, pH2.5
 Incubate AB42 for 20 minutes
 Dissolve AB42 in 500 uL dissociation buffer in Microcon centrifugal device
 Centrifuge for 20 minutes at 16,000 G at 
 Invert filter and spin for 3 minutes at 2000 G
 Bring the sample back to a neutral pH with 15-2uL 2.5M Tris pH9
 Add ELISA buffer (1.5% BSA and 0.05% Tween 20 in phosphate buffered saline)
 Perform ELISA analysis.

Result 

The white block represents non-dissociation data. The black block represents dissociation data. As the ELISA result shows, the detection of antibody is blocked by addition of beta-amyloid when the experiment was performed without dissociation. Following dissociation, the level of antibody detected increased to a level nearly control to level of control.

He used the same methodology in vivo to examine sera collected from AD patients. The results, surprisingly, demonstrated a significant increase in antibody titer. It contradicts the majority of studies arguing that the amyloid-beta antibody decreases in AD patients. The non-dissociated sample follows the widespread theory that amyloid-beta decreases in AD patients. However, he had already proven that a non-dissociated sample fails to bring out a valid result. The dissociated sample results show significant increases in AD patients, which contradicts the majority of previous studies.

Contribution 
Currently, there are many biomarkers for diagnosis of Alzheimer's disease. However, most of them do not provide consistent data results. The novel approach (autoantibody) not only explained the discrepancy of results in previous studies of autoantibody, but provided a new standard as a biomarker of Alzheimer's disease. Compared to other biomarkers which have variable measurements on diagnosis of AD, the new autoantibody approach accurately measures Aβ level with high sensitivity, and proved itself to be an excellent biomarker for Alzheimer's disease. It is believed that the new technology will provide not only future early diagnosis of Alzheimer's disease but also possible therapy for Alzheimer's disease. An open international study group (ND.Neuromark.net) has been constituted for arranging scientific information and developing a rational guide for implementing biomarkers into routine practice.

See also 

 Autoantibody
 Amyloid beta
 Biomarker
 BACE1
 Neuroregeneration
 Dementia

References 

Alzheimer's disease
Biomarkers